The Greenwich by-election of 8 July 1971 was held after the Labour Member of Parliament (MP) Richard Marsh resigned from the House of Commons to take up the post of Chairman of British Rail. The seat was retained by Labour.

Results

References

Greenwich by-election
Greenwich by-election
Greenwich,1971
Greenwich,1971
Greenwich by-election